Renaud (Reginald) de Vichiers (? – 20 January 1256) was the 19th Grand Master of the Knights Templar from 1250 to 1256.

He joined the Knights Templar and was appointed Preceptor of Saint-Jean-d'Acre in 1240 and Master of France from 1242 to 1249.

He was a supporter and comrade-in-arms of Louis IX of France, who helped him be elected Grand Master in place of Guillaume de Sonnac, killed in Egypt at the Battle of Al Mansurah, February 11, 1250. He shortly quarreled with Louis, though, over a diplomatic mission of Hugues de Jouy, the Templar Marshal, to Damascus. In 1252 Hugues was banished from the Kingdom of Jerusalem.

In 1252 Renaud de Vichiers retired to a monastery where he stayed until his death on 20 January 1256.

Notes

1256 deaths
Grand Masters of the Knights Templar
Christians of the Sixth Crusade
Christians of the Seventh Crusade
13th-century French people
Year of birth unknown